The Popsicle EP is the first EP and third major release by the "spunk rock" band Zolof the Rock & Roll Destroyer. Kenny Vasoli (of The Starting Line) performs guest vocals on "Argh... I'm a Pirate", while Anthony Green (of Circa Survive and Saosin) returns to perform additional vocals on "This Was All a Bad Idea".

Track listing
"Argh...I'm a Pirate" – 1:52
"This Was All a Bad Idea" – 2:45
"Oh William" – 3:05
"Crazy = Cute" – 2:16
"Popsicle" – 3:54

References

External links 

2004 EPs
Zolof the Rock & Roll Destroyer albums